Mart Remans (born 21 June 1998) is a Dutch professional footballer who plays as a winger for Eerste Divisie club MVV.

Career

Roda JC Kerkrade
Remans was born in Eygelshoven, part of Kerkrade, Limburg, and began playing football for Laura Hopel Combinatie. Shortly after he moved to the Roda JC Kerkrade academy.

Remans made his Eerste Divisie debut for Roda JC Kerkrade on 17 August 2018 in a game against Jong Ajax, replacing Mitchel Paulissen in the 93rd minute. On 14 December 2018, he scored his first professional goal, opening the score in a 2–1 league victory against Volendam.

In October 2020, he was sent on a one-season loan to Eerste Divisie rivals TOP Oss.

MVV
On 25 August 2021, it was announced that Remans had signed a three-year contract with provincial rivals MVV, making the move alongside Roda JC teammate Nicky Souren. He made his debut for the club two days later, starting in a 5–0 away loss to Volendam. On 5 September, he scored his first goals for the club, bagging a first-half brace in a 3–0 victory against Telstar.

On 18 March 2022, Remans scored a spectacular goal from his own half. With 1–1 the score, Remans noticed that De Graafschap's goalkeeper Hidde Jurjus was standing a long way out of his goal, and hit a shot from before the halfway line that floated over the goalkeeper and into the net. The goal helped MVV to the lead as they won 3–1.

Career statistics

References

External links
 

1998 births
Living people
Dutch footballers
Roda JC Kerkrade players
TOP Oss players
MVV Maastricht players
Eerste Divisie players
Association football midfielders
Sportspeople from Kerkrade
Footballers from Limburg (Netherlands)